Presidential elections were held in Cameroon on 23 March 1965. Incumbent Ahmadou Ahidjo was the only candidate, and won 100% of the vote as the candidate of the Cameroonian Union-Kamerun National Democratic Party alliance. Voter turnout was 95.1%.

Results

References

Single-candidate elections
Cameroon presidential
Presidential election
Presidential elections in Cameroon
Cameroonian presidential election